The Edvard Grieg oil field (known until 2012 as Luno oil field), is an oil field on the Utsira High. It was discovered in 2007. It is expected to hold around 150 million barrels of oil.

The field is operated by Lundin who has 50% share of ownership, while the rest is shared between OMV (20%), Statoil (15%) and Wintershall (15%).

Production is planned to start in 2015.

See also 

 List of oil fields

References

External links 
Edvard Grieg oil field at Lundin

North Sea oil fields
Oil fields in Norway